The Sharjah Senior Golf Masters presented by Shurooq is a men's senior (over 50) professional golf tournament on the European Senior Tour. It was held for the first time in March 2017 at Sharjah Golf and Shooting Club, Sharjah, United Arab Emirates. Total prize money was €425,000. It was the first European Senior Tour event held in the United Arab Emirates since the Abu Dhabi European Seniors Tour Championship in 2000.

The Sharjah Golf and Shooting Club only has a nine-hole course and the tournament was the first European Tour, European Challenge Tour or European Senior Tour event to be played on a nine-hole course. In 2017, the par-3 and par-5 holes (holes 3, 4, 6 and 8) were played from different tees when played the second time. In 2018, all holes, except the first, used two different tees. In addition two pin positions were used on each green on the final day.

Winners

References

External links
Coverage on the European Senior Tour's official site

European Senior Tour events
Golf tournaments in the United Arab Emirates
Recurring sporting events established in 2017
2017 establishments in the United Arab Emirates